Albany Prison may refer to:

Albany Regional Prison, a prison in Albany, Western Australia
Albany (HM Prison), a prison on the Isle of Wight in England